This is a list of active and extinct volcanoes.

References 

Tiho Information

Djibouti
Volcanoes